Hassane Brahim (16 November 1994) is a Chadian football player. He has made three appearances for the Chad national football team.

Career 

Hassane won Coupe de Ligue de N'Djaména with Elect in 2012 and 2014, and played with his club in CAF Confederation Cup 2 times: in 2013 and 2015. He was the club captain. He currently plays for Mangasport in Gabon. He was best goalscorer of the season 2014 in Chad, with 19 goals, and best goalscorer of the Gabonese D1 league in season 2016/17, with 16 goals.

International career 

Hassane debuted for Chad on 15 April 2014 in Doha, in a friendly match against Yemen.

See also
 List of Chad international footballers

References

1989 births
Living people
People from N'Djamena
Chadian footballers
Chad international footballers
Elect-Sport FC players
AS CotonTchad players
AS Mangasport players
Etincelles F.C. players
Association football forwards
Chadian expatriate footballers
Expatriate footballers in Gabon
Chadian expatriate sportspeople in Gabon
Expatriate footballers in Rwanda